Al-Shiokh  is a Syrian village located in Salquin Nahiyah in Harem District, Idlib.  According to the Syria Central Bureau of Statistics (CBS), Al-Shiokh had a population of 331 in the 2004 census.

References 

Populated places in Harem District